Costa Mesa High School/Middle School is a public  secondary school serving grades 7 through 12 in Costa Mesa, California.  It is part of the Newport Mesa Unified School District.

Campus 
In 2009, the Newport-Mesa Board of Education approved plans for a new middle school enclave and a performing arts center. In 2010, a $6.6 million aquatics center featuring a 50-meter swimming pool, locker rooms, and a classroom was opened. Before this, the pool was 25 yards long and in the shape of an L. In 2011, Costa Mesa Middle School opened its teen center. In 2013, plans were approved for a new track and field on campus. That same year, the final construction beam was in place for the new middle school enclave building. In 2014, Costa Mesa High School opened a new performing arts center with a 335-seat theater. In 2016, construction of the new track and football stadium was completed.

Athletics 
Costa Mesa High School is part of the Orange Coast League of the CIF Southern Section, part of the California Interscholastic Federation.

Notable alumni  
Sharon Day-Monroe - heptathlete
Dan Quisenberry - baseball pitcher
Quinton Bell - NFL player

References

External links
CMHS website

High schools in Orange County, California
Public high schools in California
Public middle schools in California
Buildings and structures in Costa Mesa, California
1958 establishments in California